Smolensk was a Hansa A Type cargo ship which was built as Günther in 1944 by Neptun AG, Rostock, Germany for Hamburg South Amerika Line. She was seized as a prize of war in 1945, passing to the Ministry of War Transport and renamed Empire Galashiels. She was allocated to the Soviet Union in 1946, she was renamed Smolensk. She served until 1976 when she was scrapped.

Description

The ship was propelled by a compound steam engine, which had two cylinders of 42 cm (16 inches) and two cylinders of 90 cm (35 inches) diameter by 90 cm (35 inches) stroke. The engine was built by Neptun AG.

History
Günther was a Hansa A Type cargo ship built in 1944 as yard number 523 by Neptun AG, Rostock, Germany for Hamburg Südamerikanische Dampfschifffahrts-Gesellschaft A/S & Co KG. She was launched on 4 April and completed on 8 July. Her port of registry was Hamburg.

In May 1945, Günther was seized as a prize of war at Rostock. She was passed to the Ministry of War Transport. She was renamed Empire Galashiels. The Code Letters GMVM and United Kingdom Official Number 180604 were allocated. Her port of registry was London and she was operated under the management of Glen & Co. Ltd,  Glasgow.

In 1946, Empire Galashiels was allocated to the Soviet Union and was renamed Smolensk. Her port of registry was Riga and the Code Letters UKEA were allocated. She served ports in Estonia and Latvia. With their introduction in the 1960s, Smolensk was allocated the IMO Number 5332525. She served until 1976, when she was scrapped in the Soviet Union.

References

External links
Photograph of Smolensk.

1944 ships
Ships built in Rostock
World War II merchant ships of Germany
Steamships of Germany
Empire ships
Ministry of War Transport ships
Merchant ships of the United Kingdom
Steamships of the United Kingdom
Merchant ships of the Soviet Union
Steamships of the Soviet Union